Takuya Miyamoto may refer to:
Takuya Miyamoto (footballer, born 1983) (宮本 卓也), Japanese footballer
Takuya Miyamoto (footballer, born 1993) (宮本 拓弥), Japanese footballer